The Hârtibaciu (German: Harbach; Hungarian: Hortobágy) is a river in the Transylvania historical region of Romania. It develops in the South Carpathians and flows into the Cibin, a tributary of the Olt, in Mohu, southeast of Sibiu. It flows through the towns and villages Bărcuț, Retiș, Brădeni, Netuș,  Agnita, Benești, Alțâna, Nocrich, Hosman, Cornățel and Cașolț.

King Géza II of Hungary settled the initial Transylvanian Saxon colonists along the Hârtibaciu, referred to by them as the Harbach. The Saxons established many towns along the river such as Agnita with Kirchenburgen, or fortified churches.

Tributaries

The following rivers are tributaries to the river Hârtibaciu (from source to mouth):

Left: Valea Morii, Albac, Androchiel, Marpod, Fofeldea, Ghijasa
Right: Sărătura, Halmer, Valea Comunală, Valea Satului, Valea Înfundăturii, Valea Stricată, Coveș, Bârghiș, Zlagna, Hârța, Vurpăr, Țichindeal, Lacul Roșia, Zăvoi, Daia, Cașolț

References

Rivers of Romania
Rivers of Brașov County
Rivers of Sibiu County